The Canada Cup ( Maple Cup) of 1999 was an international football (soccer) tournament played at the Commonwealth Stadium in Edmonton, Alberta, Canada from 2 June 1999 to 6 June 1999. It included hosts Canada, Iran, Ecuador and Guatemala, which replaced the Brazil Olympic Team.

All games were considered full FIFA international games. Ecuador's striker Ariel Graziani became top scorer of the event, scoring three goals in three matches.

Final table

Results

Ecuador vs Iran

Canada vs Guatemala

Ecuador vs Guatemala

Canada vs Iran

Iran vs Guatemala

Canada vs Ecuador

References

RSSSF

1999
1999 in Ecuadorian football
1999 in Canadian soccer
1999 in Guatemalan sport
1998–99 in Iranian football
June 1999 sports events in Canada